= Southern Shield =

American newspaper

Southern Shield was a newspaper in Helena, Arkansas from 1840–1874. It was established by Quincy K. Underwood Sr. and his brother Washington L. Underwood. Quincy served as editor. Washington died in 1851. Confederates burned the newspaper office in 1861, and its publication was suspended during the American Civil War.

It was a weekly paper printed on Saturdays. It supported the Whig Party. It criticized Democrats and their convention as disunionist. It was Unionist. Quincy Underwood died in 1876 two years after it ceased publication.

== History ==
It was preceded by Helena the State Democrat and Herald newspapers.

Q. K. Underwood was born in Alabama. He was a lawyer and received a recommendation to become military governor of Arkansas. He became a county judge after the war.

Underwood applied for the paper to be public printer.
